Finn Kvalem (April 12, 1934 – February 26, 1990) was a Norwegian actor, stage director, and translator.

Kvalem had his debut at the Norwegian Theater in 1955, where he was engaged from 1956 to 1969. After that, he was at the National Theater in Oslo from 1969 to 1975. and again in 1985. He performed for NRK's television Theater from 1975 to 1979 and was the director of the Telemark Theater from 1982 to 1984. Kvalem is best remembered for his interpretation of Vidkun Quisling in Stein Ørnhøi's 1988 documentary Et liv – en rettssak (A Life: A Court Case). He also appeared in several Norwegian films.

Kvalem was the head of the Norwegian Actors' Equity Association from 1974 to 1976.

Filmography

 1955: Barn av solen as Jan
 1960: Venner as the mountain-climbing club's secretary
 1962: Tonny as Rødtopp
 1969: Psychedelica Blues as Lillegutt
 1978: Gengangere as Pastor Manders (TV)
 1979: Fruen fra havet as Doctor Wangel (TV)
 1987: Over grensen as Jacob Feldmann 
 1988: Blücher as Leif Welder, Linda's father
 1988: Et liv – en rettssak as Vidkun Quisling (TV)
 1989: 1814 (TV)

References

External links
 
 Finn Kvalem at the Swedish Film Database
 Finn Kvalem at Filmfront

1934 births
1990 deaths
20th-century Norwegian male actors
People from Seljord